Neo Rysio is a village and a community of the Thermi municipality. Before the 2011 local government reform it was part of the municipality of Thermi, of which it was a municipal district. The 2011 census recorded 2,952 inhabitants in the village. The community of Neo Rysio covers an area of 15.068 km2.

See also
 List of settlements in the Thessaloniki regional unit

References

Populated places in Thessaloniki (regional unit)